CLPPNG is the debut studio album by American hip hop group clipping. It was released on June 10, 2014, through Sub Pop as the follow-up to their debut mixtape midcity.

Composition
Thomas Quinlan of Exclaim! writes that the album sees the group continue their combination of musique concrète and gangsta rap, while deeming it more accessible than their earlier work. Fred Thomas of AllMusic deems it a harsh album that fuses "noise frequencies, brutally dark beats, and MC Daveed Diggs' unhinged, often ugly lyrical flow." "Intro" features rapping over a beatless backdrop of feedback reminiscent of Merzbow. "Dream" features a "ringing bell, white noise and tape hiss", while the next track "Get Up" is built solely around the sound of an alarm clock. The album also features a performance of John Cage's Williams Mix (1951–1953), recorded with Tom Erbe.

Track listing

Charts

References

External links
 

2014 debut albums
Sub Pop albums
Clipping. albums
Musique concrète albums
Gangsta rap albums by American artists